Double Shot at Love is an American reality television show featuring DJ Pauly D and Vinny Guadagnino from Jersey Shore. The first season, a dating game show spin-off of the original Shot at Love series starring Tila Tequila and the Ikki Twins, premiered on MTV on April 11, 2019. This season featured 20 women competing for the attention and affection of both Pauly and Vinny.

The second season, dubbed Vegas Ex-scape, premiered on June 11, 2020, and featured six contestants from the first season, plus three additional male cast members, who moved into Pauly and Vinny's suite at The Linq hotel in Las Vegas, while working at Drai's Beachclub & Nightclub.

The series was renewed for a third season on April 13, 2021. It reverted to the first season's dating show format, with Pauly and Nikki guiding Vinny on the search for his perfect match. The season premiered on September 16, 2021.

Cast

Season 1

Season 2
Nikki Hall
Maria Elizondo
Derynn Paige
Marissa Lucchese
Brittani "B-Lashes" Schwartz
Suzi Baidya
Brandon Stakemann
Antonio Locke
Nicky Curd

Season 3

Episodes

Series overview

Season 1 (2019)

Season 2 (2020)

Season 3 (2021)

References

External links
Double Shot at Love at MTV

2010s American reality television series
2019 American television series debuts
American dating and relationship reality television series
MTV original programming
2020s American reality television series
American television spin-offs
Reality television spin-offs